The Liberal Party of Switzerland was a political party in Switzerland with economically liberal policies. It was known as a party of the upper class. On 1 January 2009 it merged with the larger Free Democratic Party (FDP/PRD) to establish FDP.The Liberals.

It was strongest in the Protestant cantons in Romandy, particularly in the cantons of Geneva, Vaud and Neuchâtel. In contrast, the ideologically similar FDP was successful nationwide. The Liberal Party was a member of Liberal International.

History
In the 2003 federal election, the party had a joint slate with the Free Democratic Party. The party was the junior partner of the faction, with only 2.2% of the vote compared with the FDP's 17.3%. However, in their strongholds of the  cantons of Romandy and the canton of Basel-City, they were particularly successful. Their best performance was in Geneva, where they received 16.8% of the vote.  It won 4 seats (out of 200) in the Swiss National Council, but was represented in neither the second chamber nor in the Swiss Federal Council, the government's cabinet.

After the election, the Liberals and FDP founded a common caucus in the Federal Assembly. In June 2005, they strengthened their cooperation by founding the Radical and Liberal Union.  They finally merged on 1 January 2009 with the Free Democratic Party of Switzerland to form the "FDP.The Liberals".

Presidents
 1981–1985   Lukas Burckhardt, Basel
 1985–1989   Gilbert Coutau, Geneva
 1989–1993   Claude Bonnard, Vaud
 1993–1997   François Jeanneret, Vaud
 1997–2002   Jacques-Simon Eggly, Geneva
 2002–2008   Claude Ruey, Vaud
 2008–2009   Pierre Weiss, Geneva

See also
Liberalism and radicalism in Switzerland

Footnotes

 
Libertarian parties
Classical liberal parties
Conservative liberal parties
Defunct liberal political parties